Rhenium–osmium dating is a form of radiometric dating based on the beta decay of the isotope 187Re to 187Os.  This normally occurs with a half-life of 41.6 × 109 y, but studies using fully ionised 187Re atoms have found that this can decrease to only 33 y. Both rhenium and osmium are strongly siderophilic (iron loving), while Re is also chalcophilic (sulfur loving) making it useful in dating sulfide ores such as gold and Cu-Ni deposits.

This dating method is based on an isochron calculated based on isotopic ratios measured using N-TIMS (Negative – Thermal Ionization Mass Spectrometry).

Rhenium–osmium isochron 
Rhenium–osmium dating is carried out by the isochron dating method. Isochrons are created by analysing several samples believed to have formed at the same time from a common source. The Re-Os isochron plots the ratio of radiogenic 187Os to non-radiogenic 188Os against the ratio of the parent isotope 187Re to the non-radiogenic isotope 188Os. The stable and relatively abundant osmium isotope 188Os is used to normalize the radiogenic isotope in the isochron.

The Re-Os isochron is defined by the following equation:

where: 
 t is the age of the sample,
 λ is the decay constant of 187Re,
 (eλt-1) is the slope of the isochron which defines the age of the system.

A good example of an application of the Re-Os isochron method is a study on the dating of a gold deposit in the Witwatersrand mining camp, South Africa.

Rhenium-osmium isotopic evolution 
Rhenium and osmium were strongly refractory and siderophile during the initial accretion of the Earth which caused both elements to preferentially enter the Earth's core. Thus the two elements should be depleted in the silicate Earth yet the 187Os / 188Os ratio of mantle is chondritic. The reason for this apparent contradiction is owed to the change in behavior between Re and Os in partial melt events. Re tends to enter the melt phase (incompatible) while Os remains in the solid residue (compatible). This causes high ratios of Re/Os in oceanic crust (which is derived from partial melting of mantle) and low ratios of Re/Os in the lower mantle. In this regard, the Re–Os system to study the geochemical evolution of mantle rocks and in defining the chronology of mantle differentiation is extremely helpful.

Peridotite xenoliths which are thought to sample the upper mantle sometimes contain supra-chondritic Os-isotopic ratios. This is thought to evidence of subducted ancient high Re/Os basaltic crust that is being recycled back into the mantle. This combination of radiogenic (187Os that was created by decay of 187Re) and nonradiogenic melts helps to support the theory of at least two Os-isotopic reservoirs in the mantle. The volume of both these reservoirs is thought to be around 5-10% of the whole mantle. The first reservoir is characterized by depletion in Re and proxies for melt fertility (such as concentrations of elements like Ca and Al). The second reservoir is chondritic in composition.

Direct measurement of the age of continental crust through Re-Os dating is difficult. Infiltration of xenoliths by their commonly Re-rich magma alters the true elemental Re/Os ratios. Instead, determining model ages can be done in two ways: "Re depletion" model ages or the "melting age" model. The former finds the minimum age of the extraction event assuming the elemental Re/Os ratio equals 0 (komatiite residues have Re/Os of 0, so this is assuming a xenolith was extracted from a near-komatiite melt). The latter gives the age of the melting event inferred from the point when a melt proxy like Al2O3 is equal to 0 (ancient subcontinental lithosphere has weight percentages of CaO and Al2O3 ranging from 0 to 2%).

Pt–Re–Os systematics 
The radioactive decay of 190Pt to 186Os has a half-life of 6.5(3)×1011 years (which is longer than the age of the universe, so it is essentially stable). However, in-situ 187Os / 188Os and 186Os / 188Os of modern plume related magmas show simultaneous enrichment which implies a source that is supra-chondritic in Pt/Os and Re/Os. Since both parental isotopes have extremely long half-lives, the Os-isotope rich reservoir must be very old to allow enough time for the daughter isotopes to form. These observations are interpreted to support the theory Archean subducted crust contributed Os-isotope rich melts back into the mantle.

References

Radiometric dating
Rhenium
Osmium